This was a new event on the 2013 ITF Women's Circuit at São Paulo's Clube Hebraica as the men's ATP Challenger Tour came to the Brazilian city again after April's IS Open de Tênis.

Paula Cristina Gonçalves and Roxane Vaisemberg were the defending champions from 2012's $10,000 event at São Paulo's Clube Painieras do Morumby, but Gonçalves chose not to defend her title. Vaisemberg partnered up with Flávia Dechandt Araújo, but they lost in the semifinals.

Laura Pigossi and Carolina Zeballos won the tournament, defeating Nathália Rossi and Luisa Stefani in the final, 6–3, 6–4.

Seeds

Draw

References

External links 
 Draw

Sao Paulo Challenger de Tenis - Women's Doubles
Tennis tournaments in Brazil